Woodmen of the World Building may refer to:
Woodmen of the World Building (Omaha, Nebraska), the tallest building between Chicago and the West Coast when built in 1912
Woodmen of the World Building (Nacogdoches, Texas), a two-part commercial block building

See also
List of Woodmen of the World buildings